Potubəyli (also, Potubeyli) is a village and municipality in the Saatly Rayon of Azerbaijan.  It has a population of 944.

References 

Populated places in Saatly District